
Year 125 BC was a year of the pre-Julian Roman calendar. At the time it was known as the Year of the Consulship of Hypsaeus and Flaccus (or, less frequently, year 629 Ab urbe condita) and the Fourth Year of Yuanshuo. The denomination 125 BC for this year has been used since the early medieval period, when the Anno Domini calendar era became the prevalent method in Europe for naming years.

Events 
 By place 
 Syria 
 Cleopatra Thea succeeds to the rule of the Seleucid Empire on the death of Seleucus V. She appoints Antiochus VIII Grypus as co-ruler.

 Roman Republic 
 In Rome, Marcus Fulvius Flaccus proposes the extension of Roman citizenship to the northern Italians, but the Senate reacts by sending him off to deal with disturbances around Massilia.  And in so doing, commences the conquest of Transalpine Gaul.

 China 
 In retaliation for the Han conquest of the Ordos Plateau two years prior, three Xiongnu forces raid the Prefectures of Dai, Dingxiang and Shang.
 The Xiongnu Tuqi (Worthy Prince) of the Right (West), especially angry at the loss of the Ordos Plateau, invades the region and kills or carries off a large number of officials and other inhabitants.

Births 
 Quintus Sertorius, Roman statesman and general (d. 73 BC)

Deaths 
 Demetrius II, king of the Seleucid Empire
 Seleucus V Philometor (killed by Cleopatra Thea)

References